Scott Flory (born July 15, 1976) is the head coach of the University of Saskatchewan's Huskies football team. He is also a former professional Canadian football offensive lineman who played for 15 years for the Montreal Alouettes of the Canadian Football League.

Shortly after retiring, Flory was elected as the tenth president of the Canadian Football League Players' Association, a role he served until 2016.

University career
Flory played CIAU football for the Saskatchewan Huskies from 1994 to 1998. He won two Vanier Cup championships while playing for the team, in 1996 and 1998. He was also named a CIAU All-Canadian twice and a Canada West All-Star three times.

Professional career
Flory was drafted in the third round, 15th overall, by the Montreal Alouettes in the 1998 CFL Draft. He returned to university for his final year of eligibility in 1998 and then joined the Alouettes in 1999. He won three Grey Cup championships and was twice named the CFL's Most Outstanding Offensive Lineman. He was also an 11-time East Division All-Star and nine-time CFL All-Star, which is second only to Willie Pless who was named a CFL All-Star 11 times. He announced his retirement on May 7, 2014. He was inducted into the Canadian Football Hall of Fame in 2018.

References

External links

Saskatchewan Huskies bio
Just Sports Stats
Montreal Alouettes player biography

1976 births
Living people
Canadian football offensive linemen
Montreal Alouettes players
Players of Canadian football from Saskatchewan
Saskatchewan Huskies football coaches
Saskatchewan Huskies football players
Sportspeople from Regina, Saskatchewan
Canadian Football Hall of Fame inductees